Stemmatophora valida is a species of snout moth. It is found in  Korea, Japan, China and the north-western Himalaya.

Its wingspan is 17–23 mm. The ground colour of its forewings is pale grayish brown. Adults are on wing from June to August.

References

Moths described in 1879
Pyralini
Moths of Asia